Beit El Faqs   is a Sunni Muslim Lebanese village located in the Miniyeh-Danniyeh District in the region of North Lebanon.

References

External links
 Beit El Faqs, Localiban
www.beitelfaks.com

Populated places in Miniyeh-Danniyeh District
Populated places in Lebanon
Sunni Muslim communities in Lebanon